Brently Heilbron (born December 1, 1976) is an American comedian, musician, and actor based in Austin, Texas. He is best known for Tiny Desk Concerts with emo puppet band Fragile Rock and his work with director Robert Rodriguez.

Career

Brently Heilbron began performing standup comedy at the age of 15 in Dallas after skipping school to audition for a local comedy club. In 2007, he hosted Sir Paul McCartney's special live appearance at Amoeba Music.  His verbatim performance of R. Kelly's Trapped in the Closet in its entirety earned him a mention in both a Los Angeles Times blog, and in The New York Times among others. On the stage, he was hand-picked by Woody Allen to appear in the Los Angeles Opera production of Gianni Schicchi. He has hosted and created the series Stand Up Empire on PBS, appeared the Bravo improvised television series Significant Others as well as Season 5 of Friday Night Lights on NBC, The Lying Game on ABC Family and The Leftovers (TV series) on HBO

In 1999, he was called Austin's best stand-up comic in the Arts and Entertainment section of the Austin Chronicle..  The Austin Chronicle described Brently as "one of the most prolific and inventive comics anywhere".

In 2012, Brently led supporters and friends of Leslie Cochran in organizing Leslie Fest to pay tribute to the Austin icon and raise money for Hospice Austin.

In 2016, he created a comedy series for PBS called Stand Up Empire.  In 2017, his emo puppet band Fragile Rock was featured on NPR's Tiny Desk Concerts.

In 2019, Brently worked with director Robert Rodriguez twice; as the psychotic Doc Sock in Red 11 and superhero Crushing Low in We Can Be Heroes. Also in 2019, Fragile Rock was asked to return to South by Southwest for a 4th time.

In 2020, Brently appeared in the Netflix film We Can Be Heroes, in which the characters of The Adventures of Sharkboy and Lavagirl in 3-D also appeared. 44 million families watched the film in the first our weeks and shortly after, it was announced Rodriguez would be developing a sequel for Netflix.

In 2022, it was announced that Fragile Rock will return to SXSW for a 6th time.

Discography

In 2018, he wrote and performed "Wakeup To The Breakup" released by Fragile Rock.

References

External links
BrentlyHeilbron.com
Fragile Rock
imdb.com
Ellie'sRandR.com

1976 births
Living people
American stand-up comedians
21st-century American comedians
Male actors from Austin, Texas
Male actors from Texas